Joe Mullen (born 5 January 1964 in Adelaide, Australia) is an Australian former football (soccer) player.

As a player, he won three National Soccer League titles.

On 1 May 2008 Mullen was appointed as Adelaide United's inaugural youth team coach.

In 2013, Mullen was appointed the new manager of National Premier Leagues South Australia football club Campbelltown City SC.

In addition to being a manager, Mullen is also a coach instructor, instructing coaches in the AFC C licence for FFSA.

Honours

Player
With Adelaide City:
  NSL Championship: 1986, 1991–1992, 1993–1994
   NSL Cup: 1989, 1991–1992
Personal honours:
 FFSA Award of Distinction: 2005

Manager
With Green Gully:
 VPL Championship: 2003–2004
With Bulleen Zebras:
 Victorian Italia Cup: 2002
 U-14 Victorian Super League: 2003
 U-14 Victorian Super League Cup: 2003

References

External links
 Adelaide United profile
 Oz Football profile

Association football forwards
1964 births
Living people
Soccer players from Adelaide
Australian soccer players
National Soccer League (Australia) players
Adelaide City FC players
Melbourne City FC non-playing staff